New Directions is the eighth and final studio album by the funk group The Meters. Produced by David Rubinson in California, it is the band's first and only album produced outside New Orleans. The album features the Oakland-based Tower of Power horn section.

Reception

Stephen Erlewine of Allmusic called the music gritty and a move in the right direction as compared to the band's previous album Trick Bag. John Swenson of Rolling Stone said the album "attempts to consolidate the group's style" and noted an overreliance on arrangement rather than the band's musical instinct. Music critique Robert Christgau called the album "a very good commercial funk record."

Track listing

Personnel
The Meters
Ziggy Modeliste – drums, vocals; lead vocals (track 5)
Art Neville – organ, vocals; lead vocals (tracks 2, 6)
Cyril Neville – congas, vocals; lead vocals (tracks 1, 3, 4, 7, 8)
Leo Nocentelli – guitar, vocals
George Porter Jr. – bass, vocals

Additional Personnel
Emilio Castillo – tenor saxophone
Mic Gillette – trombone, trumpet, flugelhorn
Stephen "Doc" Kupka – baritone saxophone
Lenny Pickett – alto flute, alto and soprano and tenor saxophone
Kurt McGettrick – baritone saxophone (tracks 1, 2, 4), bass saxophone (track 2), clarinet (track 7), flute (track 7), horn arrangements
Swamp Tabernacle Choir – background vocals

Production
David Rubinson – producer, engineer
Jeffrey Cohen – producer
Fred Catero – engineer
Chris Minto – engineer
Fred Rubinson – engineer
Bob Irwin – mastering
Bill Naegels – design
Rich Russell – design
Ron Coro – design
Gary Heery – photography
Michael P. Smith – photography
John Cabalka – art direction
Ed Thrasher – art direction, photography
Bill Dahl – liner notes

References

1977 albums
The Meters albums
Albums produced by Dave Rubinson
Warner Records albums